New Mexico State University Grants (NMSU Grants) is a public community college in Grants, New Mexico. It is a branch campus of New Mexico State University.

History 
NMSU Grants was established as a branch of New Mexico State University in 1968 through the cooperative efforts of New Mexico State University and Grants Municipal Schools.

Academics

The college offer certificates, associate degree, bachelor's and master's degrees through the College of Extended Learning and Distance Learning in Las Cruces, New Mexico. The campus also provides Adult Basic Education program that enable residents to earn a general equivalency diploma (GED), and also hosts Small Business Development Center (SBDC).

References

External links
Official website

New Mexico State University
Community colleges in New Mexico
Grants, New Mexico